The 2013 CMT Music Awards is a music award ceremony that was held on Wednesday, June 5, 2013 at the Bridgestone Arena in Nashville, Tennessee. CMT. The show was hosted by CMT Award winner Jason Aldean and Kristen Bell.

Winners and nominees
The winners are highlighted in bold.

Presenters 
Kellie Pickler & Scotty McCreery — presented USA Weekend Breakthrough Video of the Year
Anna Sophia Robb & Brantley Gilbert — Introduced Miranda Lambert
Scott Avett & Seth Avett — Introduced Kacey Musgraves.
Duane "Dog" Chapman & Beth Champan — Presented CMT Performance of the Year
Florida Georgia Line — Introduced Darius Rucker.
Larry the Cable Guy — Presented Collaborative Video of the Year
Jana Kramer & Charles Esten — Presented Duo Video of the Year
Ed Sheeran & Lisa Marie Presley — Introduced Lady Antebellum
Lenny Kravitz — Presented Female Video of the Year
The Band Perry — Introduced Keith Urban.
Keith Urban — Introduced Little Big Town.
Dax Shepard, Kevin Bacon & Michael Bacon — Presented Group Video of the Year
Kristen Bell — Introduced Jason Aldean.
Miranda Lambert — Presented Male Video of the Year
Rascal Flatts — Introduced Carrie Underwood
Sheryl Crow & Kenny Rogers — Presented Video of the Year

Performers

Nationwide Insurance Stage performers
Cassadee Pope — "Wasting All These Tears"
Dustin Lynch — "Cowboys and Angels"
Kree Harrison — "All Cried Out"
Randy Houser — "How Country Feels"
Love and Theft — "Angel Eyes"
Ashley Monroe — "Weed Instead of Roses"

Notes 
1 Miranda Lambert goes solo (Without Blake Shelton)

References

2013 music awards
CMT Music